Nova Roma (Latin for 'New Rome") is an international Roman revivalist and reconstructionist organization created in 1998 by Joseph Bloch and William Bradford, later incorporated in Maine as a non-profit organization with an educational and religious mission. Nova Roma claims to promote "the restoration of classical Roman religion, culture, and virtues" and "shared Roman ideals".

Reported to provide online resources about Roman culture, Latin, ancient Roman costuming and reenactment guidelines, Nova Roma aims to be more than a community of reenactors or history study group. Strimska, Davy, Adler, Gallagher-Ashcraft, and recently Chryssides refer to it as a polytheistic reconstructionist community. Because it has a structure based on the ancient Roman Republic, with a senate, magistrates and laws enacted by vote of the comitia, and with its own coinage, and because the Nova Roma Wiki states that the group self-identifies as a "sovereign nation", some outside observers classify it as a micronation.

Revival of Roman religion

Nova Roma has adopted the ancient Roman religion as its state religion, but also maintains the freedom of religion of its citizens. Religious studies scholar Michael York noted that the traditional Roman way of thinking, Roman philosophy, provides the moral code for Nova Romans in their New Roman belief system.

Both the domestic religious traditions and the so-called state religion (sacra publica) are represented in the practices of Nova Roma, including the restoration of the ancient priestly collegia, including the offices of pontifex and Vestal Virgin, and the honoring of the full cycle of Roman holidays throughout the year. According to the Ontario Consultants on Religious Tolerance, at the time of Christmas, Nova Romans celebrate the Roman holiday Saturnalia.

In 2006, Margot Adler noted the organization's plan to restore a Magna Mater shrine in Rome.

Live events, conventions and reenactments

Nova Roma holds its own local and international conventions and regularly participates with its affiliated reenactment groups in such history festivals and public events as the Festival of Ancient Heritage in Svishtov, Bulgaria, the Roman Market Day in Wells, Maine's Harbor Park, and Forum Fulvii in Italy, Ludi Savarienses Historical Carnival, the Aquincum Floralia Spring Festival in Budapest, Hungary, or the Natale di Roma (the historical festival of the birthday of Rome) in Rome, Italy, where Nova Roma celebrated its twentieth anniversary.

Cultural competitions and games

Among the cultural activities of Nova Roma, competitions and games associated with various Roman festivals have an important place. They can include a wide range of various programs from humorous online games up to serious art-competitions like the Certamen Petronianum, a literary contest of historical novel writing first held in 2005, where the jury was composed of notables including Colleen McCullough, author of many Roman-themed best-selling novels, and T. P. Wiseman, university professor of Roman history and former vice-president of the British Academy, or the second edition of the same competition, where the jury was Jo Walton, World Fantasy Award-winning novelist and poet. Kristoffer From was the winner of the first Certamen Petronianum.

Coinage and sponsorship of Roman cultural projects

Nova Roma has minted two coins with the denomination of sestertius, one in bronze, issued in 2000, and another in brass, dating from 2005. Each bears the letters SPQR and has a diameter of 32mm, a thickness of 1.8 mm. These sesterces are convertible into 50 US cents, if sent back to the treasury of the organization, thus they can be used in place of real currency between members of the community. 

Regarding the monetary policies of Nova Roma, as not-for-profit organization its treasury is dedicated to sponsor various Roman cultural projects, including experimental archaeology initiatives, reenactment events, or building Roman temple reconstructions, altars or other reconstructed religious accessories or any items from the ancient Roman period.

Global chapters and subsidiaries 

The international governance of Nova Roma permits the Nova Roman communities of each country to create their national subdivision of Nova Roma, called provincia, and to form their own not-for-profit or incorporated organizations, established under the respective legislation of their local country. This enables better local recognition and management, as well as provides the means for legal and insurance coverage, such as that offered by the Australasian Living History Federation (ALHF).

Historical contexts

Revival of things Roman and their co-option for symbolic importance have a long history. Nova Roma (in Latin, literally "New Rome") in its deliberate revival of grandiose remnants of the past thus parallels and echoes other New Romes such as:

 the Byzantine or Eastern Roman Empire as a surviving embodiment of Roman ideals based on Constantinople (sometimes chartacterised as "New Rome" or the "Second Rome") after the decline of the Roman imperium in the  West.
 the doctrine of the Third Rome as justification for imperial Muscovite and Russian ambitions from the 15th century onwards.
 Mussolini's attempted construction of a Mediterranean-based New Roman Empire (compare Imperial Italy) in the early 20th century.

See also
 Mos maiorum
 Neopaganism in Latin Europe
 Roman Polytheistic Reconstructionism
 Pan-Latinism
 Polytheistic reconstructionism
 Roman Traditional Movement

Notes

References
 American Religious Identification Survey," by The Graduate Center of the City University of New York  (pdf)
 McColman, Carl. 2002. The Complete Idiot's Guide (R) to Paganism, Alpha Books. 
 Dennis A. Trinkle, Scott A. Merriman. M.E. Sharpe, 2002. US history highway, Volume 1. 
 Danese, Roberto/Bacianini, Andrea/Torino, Alessio. 2003. Weni, widi, wici: tra 'volumen" e byte, Guaraldi. 
 Strmiska, Michael. 2005. Modern Paganism in World Cultures: Comparative Perspectives, ABC-CLIO. ISBN 
 Davy, Barbara Jane. 2006. Introduction to Pagan Studies, Rowman Altamira. 
 Dennis A. Trinkle, Scott A. Merriman. M.E. Sharpe, 2006. The history highway: a 21st-century guide to Internet resources. 
 Dixon, Suzanne. 2007. Cornelia, Mother of the Gracchi, Routledge. 
 York, Michael. 2015. Pagan Ethics: Paganism as a World Religion, Springer.

External links
 

International non-profit organizations
Historical reenactment groups
Polytheistic reconstructionism
Organizations established in 1998
Non-profit organizations based in Maine
Micronations